Patricia M. Mahan is an American attorney and politician. She was elected as the Mayor of the City of Santa Clara in November 2002 and re-elected in 2006 and 2010, before serving as a councilmember after 2014 through her resignation in 2020.

References

Santa Clara University alumni
Living people
Year of birth missing (living people)
Mayors of places in California
Women mayors of places in California
21st-century American women